Denise Yarde is a British sound engineer. She was nominated for an Academy Award in the category Best Sound for the film Belfast.

Selected filmography 
 Belfast (2021; co-nominated with Simon Chase, James Mather and Niv Adiri)

References

External links 

Living people
Place of birth missing (living people)
Year of birth missing (living people)
British audio engineers
21st-century British engineers